B.P. Valenzuela is a Filipino singer-songwriter, producer and independent electronic pop artist from the Philippines. She is best known for her debut EP, be/ep (2014), and her debut studio album The Neon Hour (2015) with popular singles like "Pretty Car", and "Steady".

Aside from her main focus as an electropop musician, she also performs as half-lit.

Life and career
Valenzuela started her music career at the age of 18 while a freshman at Ateneo de Manila University, taking up Sociology and Anthropology studies. In 2014, she released her debut EP entitled be/ep and later transferred to De La Salle–College of Saint Benilde to pursue music studies. She worked as a part-time barista at Satchmi, a retail vinyl record store. Later that year, she worked on her debut album, with Nicholas Lazaro (of Twin Lobster and MOONWLK) co-producing "Pretty Car", "Building Too" and "The Fury and Sound". Her debut album, entitled The Neon Hour, was released on March 30, 2015. Her debut single, "Steady", was released in the same year and was featured in the indie film Sleepless.

Valenzuela has performed on various music festivals such as Fête dela Musique Philippines, Wanderland Music and Arts Festival (2015), Goodvybes Festival (2016), Bandwagon Riverboat Festival (2016), and has opened for acts such as No Rome, The Sam Willows and Chairlift.

Valenzuela was set to release her sophomore album, Crydancer, in July 2017.

In mid-2018, she collaborated with rock band Sandwich for the Coke Studio Philippines project.

In 2019, Valenzuela released paradigm shift, a six-song EP under her "half-lit" side project.

Discography

Albums

Studio albums

Compilation albums

Extended plays
As herself

As half-lit

Singles
As herself

As half-lit

References

Notes

1995 births
Living people
Filipino singer-songwriters
Singers from Manila
Singers from Metro Manila
Women in electronic music
Ateneo de Manila University alumni
De La Salle–College of Saint Benilde alumni
21st-century Filipino singers
21st-century Filipino women singers